Palau had its debut at the Summer Olympic Games in 2000 in Sydney. Palau has not yet participated in any Winter Olympic Games.

Palau sent two sprinters and a swimmer at the London 2012 Olympics.

Medal tables

Medals by Summer Games

See also
 List of flag bearers for Palau at the Olympics

References

External links
 
 
 
 Palau NOC